Sean Holmes is a British theatre director and former Artistic Director of Lyric Hammersmith.

Theatre directing
Holmes has worked with the Royal Shakespeare Company, directing Julius Caesar, Measure for Measure, Richard III, The Roman Actor, A New Way to Please You and the Filter theatre company co-production of Twelfth Night.

He has directed plays at the Donmar Warehouse, the Old Vic, the Royal Court and other London theatres, including The Entertainer, The English Game, The Man Who Had All the Luck, The Price, Look Back in Anger, Moonlight and Magnolias and Pornography.

He was an associate director of the Oxford Stage Company (now Headlong theatre company) from 2001 to 2006.

He directed the new stage adaptation of Treasure Island, starring Keith Allen, which opened at the West End's Theatre Royal Haymarket in November 2008. He directed a revival of Joe Orton’s Loot, starring Matt Di Angelo, at the Tricycle Theatre from December 2008.

In October 2008, it was announced that Holmes would take over from David Farr as artistic director of the Lyric Hammersmith in spring 2009. At the time of his appointment, the chairman of the theatre's board, Sandy Orr, said: "Everyone knows that Sean is one of today’s outstanding theatre directors."

In 2011, the Lyric Hammersmith won the Olivier Award for Outstanding Achievement in an Affiliate Theatre for Holmes' production of Sarah Kane's Blasted.

In autumn 2011, he directed the first London production in 27 years of Edward Bond's Saved at the Lyric Hammersmith.

In September 2019, it was announced that he would be succeeded as artistic director of the Lyric Hammersmith in February 2019 by Rachel O'Riordan.

References

British theatre directors
Living people
Year of birth missing (living people)
Alumni of King's College London